Colin Ivor Moulding (born 17 August 1955) is an English bassist, singer, and songwriter who was one of the core members of the rock band XTC. Though he was less prolific a songwriter than his bandmate Andy Partridge, Moulding wrote their first three charting UK singles: "Life Begins at the Hop" (1979), "Making Plans for Nigel" (1979) and "Generals and Majors" (1980).

Life and career
Moulding is self-taught as a bass player; he was learning rock riffs at the age of 15. He cites Andy Fraser of Free as an early musical influence, and has stated a preference for an intuitive approach to writing and playing rather than study. When writing songs Moulding has used guitars and keyboards rather than the bass guitar.

Outside his work with XTC (and their alter-ego side project The Dukes of Stratosphear), Moulding released a non-charting solo single ("Too Many Cooks in the Kitchen" b/w "I Need Protection") in 1980 under the pseudonym "The Colonel".

In 1986, David Gilmour approached Moulding over becoming Pink Floyd's new bass player following Roger Waters' departure. He turned it down as XTC were in the midst of recording Skylarking.

He later played bass and co-produced one track on the 1994 Sam Phillips album Martinis and Bikinis, and in 2005, he contributed to Billy Sherwood's Pink Floyd tribute album Return to the Dark Side of the Moon, playing bass and singing lead vocal on "Brain Damage".

In 1995, Moulding contributed bass on several tracks of French band L'Affaire Louis' Trio's album L'Homme aux mille vies.

In February 2007, Partridge told music website Pitchfork Media that Moulding was "not interested in music any more, and doesn't want to write". Moulding concurred in having a recent loss of interest in music. 

In November 2008, he emerged for an interview about "Making Plans For Nigel" for an installment in the series of interviews by Todd Bernhardt. He gave a two-hour interview in December on the Todd Rundgren fansite, Rundgren Radio.

Moulding made vocal contributions to a Billy Sherwood progressive rock album (The Prog Collective, August 2012), combining with Rick Wakeman on "Check Point Karma". He performed a lead vocal for the song "The Man Who Died Two Times" from the album In Extremis by the progressive rock band Days Between Stations (released 15 May 2013) and appears in the video for the song, released in June 2014. 

In 2012, he appeared on Sherwood's tribute album to Supertramp.

Moulding played bass on "High Noon", a track on Anton Barbeau's 2016 release Magic Act, and contributed vocals to the title track of Little World, a 2016 collaboration between Barbeau and Sacramento singer Allyson Seconds. Moulding also appeared in both the "High Noon" and "Little World" videos.

In 2017, Moulding and former XTC drummer Terry Chambers recorded an EP titled Great Aspirations that was credited to "TC&I". It was released on 20 October 2017. In October/November 2018 TC&I, featuring Moulding, Chambers, Steve Tilling, Gary Bamford, Susannah Bevington and Moulding's son Lee, played a series of six gigs at the Swindon Arts Centre. The sets consisted of a selection of Moulding's songs from XTC's career plus material from the TC&I EP and a cover of Andy Partridge's "Statue of Liberty". Highlights of the concerts were released in August 2019 on CD and in download format under the title 'Naked Flames: Live at Swindon Arts Centre'.

Discography

XTC studio album appearances' ( more correctly 'writing credits')White Music (1978)
"Crosswires"
"Do What You Do"
"I'll Set Myself on Fire"
"Dance Band" (CD bonus track)
"Heatwave" (CD bonus track)
"Instant Tunes" (CD bonus track)Go 2 (1978)
"Buzzcity Talking"
"Crowded Room"
"The Rhythm"
"I Am the Audience"Drums and Wires (1979)
"Making Plans for Nigel"
"Day in Day Out"
"Ten Feet Tall"
"That is the Way"
"Life Begins at the Hop" (CD bonus track)
"Limelight" (CD bonus track)Black Sea (1980)
"Generals and Majors"
"Love at First Sight"
"Smokeless Zone" (CD bonus track)
”Ban the Bomb (CD bonus track)English Settlement (1982)
"Runaways"
"Ball and Chain"
"Fly on the Wall"
"English Roundabout"Mummer (1983)
"Wonderland"
"Deliver Us from the Elements"
"In Loving Memory of a Name"The Big Express (1984)
"Wake Up"
"I Remember the Sun"
"Washaway" (CD bonus track)25 O'Clock (1985)
"What in the World??..."Skylarking (1986)
"Grass"
"The Meeting Place"
"Big Day"
"Dying"
"Sacrificial Bonfire"Psonic Psunspot (1987)
"Vanishing Girl"
"Shiny Cage"
"The Affiliated"Oranges and Lemons (1989)
"King for a Day"
"One of the Millions"
"Cynical Days"Nonsuch (1992)
"My Bird Performs"
"The Smartest Monkeys"
"War Dance"
"Bungalow"
"Didn't Hurt a Bit" (CD bonus track)Apple Venus Volume 1 (1999)
"Frivolous Tonight"
"Fruit Nut"Wasp Star (Apple Venus Volume 2) (2000)
"In Another Life"
"Boarded Up"
"Standing in for Joe"

Other studio album appearancesReturn to the Dark Side of the Moon (2006)
"Time" (track 3 - with members of Yes, The Doors, Hurricane...)
"Brain Damage" (track 8 - with members of Yes/Asia, The Doors, Mothers of Invention...)
(produced by Billy Sherwood)Songs of the Century - An All-Star Tribute to Supertramp (2012)
"It's Raining Again" (track 5 - with Geoff Downes)
(produced by Billy Sherwood)The Prog Collective (2012)
"Chek Point Karma" (track 7 - with Rick Wakeman - CD1)
"Check Point Karma" (track 7 - instrumental - CD2)
(produced by Billy Sherwood)In Extremis by Days Between Stations (2013)
"The Man Who Died Two Times" (track 5 - with Days Between Stations)Magic Act by Anton Barbeau (2016)
"High Noon" (bass)Little World by Allyson Seconds and Anton Barbeau (2016)
"Little World" (vocals)Great Aspirations by TC&I (2017)
"Scatter Me"
"Greatness (The Aspiration Song)"
"Kenny"
"Comrades of Pop"
Naked Flames (TC&I live album) (2019)

Solo
"The Hardest Battle”/“Say It”(Original demo)/“ The Hardest Battle (first exploratory demo) (2021)

Compilation album appearancesRag and Bone Buffet: Rare Cuts and Leftovers (1990)
"Ten Feet Tall" (US Single Version)
"Too Many Cooks in the Kitchen"
"Looking for Footprints"
"The World is Full of Angry Young Men"
"I Need Protection"
"Officer Blue"
"Blame the Weather"A Testimonial Dinner: The Songs of XTC (1995)
"The Good Things"Coat of Many Cupboards'' (2002)
"Let's Have Fun"
"Sleepyheads"
"Find the Fox"
"Didn't Hurt a Bit"Non-album XTC songs'''

"Down a Peg"
"Say It"
"Skeletons"
"Where Did the Ordinary People Go?"

References

External links

 Chalkhills: Foremost XTC fan site

1955 births
Living people
English bass guitarists
English male guitarists
Male bass guitarists
English songwriters
English male singers
English new wave musicians
Male new wave singers
People from Swindon
XTC members
Musicians from Wiltshire